Bret Burchard is an American former basketball player and coach. He served as head coach of the Northern Arizona Suns of the NBA G League from 2018 to 2020. He attended Taylor University.

Coaching career
Buchard began his coaching career as an assistant coach for his college, Taylor University.

In 2010, he began working for the Phoenix Suns organization. In the middle of the 2017 season, he was promoted to the Phoenix Suns after the firing of the coaching staff.

On July 25, 2018 he was named the head coach of the Northern Arizona Suns, the NBA G League affiliate of the Phoenix Suns, after serving as the associate head coach of the team.

On June 19, 2019, the Suns announced that he would return as the head coach for the 2019–20 season.

Personal life
Brett's father is Bob Burchard, the recently retired head coach at Columbia College in Missouri. He served as the head coach for 31 years.

References

Living people
American men's basketball players
Basketball coaches from Missouri
Basketball players from Missouri
Sportspeople from Columbia, Missouri
Northern Arizona Suns coaches
Year of birth missing (living people)